The ω-regular languages are a class of ω-languages that generalize the definition of regular languages to infinite words.

Formal definition 
An ω-language L is ω-regular if it has the form

 Aω where A is a regular language not containing the empty string
 AB, the concatenation of a regular language A and an ω-regular language B (Note that BA is not well-defined)
 A ∪ B where A and B are ω-regular languages (this rule can only be applied finitely many times)

The elements of Aω are obtained by concatenating  words from A infinitely many times.
Note that if A is regular, Aω is not necessarily ω-regular, since A could be for example {ε}, the set containing only the empty string, in which case Aω=A, which is not an ω-language and therefore not an ω-regular language.

It is a straightforward consequence of the definition that the ω-regular languages are precisely the ω-languages of the form A1B1ω ∪ ... ∪ AnBnω for some n, where the Ais and  Bis are regular languages and the Bis do not contain the empty string.

Equivalence to Büchi automaton

Theorem: An ω-language is recognized by a Büchi automaton if and only if it is an ω-regular language.

Proof: Every ω-regular language is recognized by a nondeterministic Büchi automaton; the translation is constructive. Using the closure properties of Büchi automata and structural induction over the definition of ω-regular language, it can be easily shown that a Büchi automaton can be constructed for any given ω-regular language.

Conversely, for a given Büchi automaton , we construct an ω-regular language and then we will show that this language is recognized by A. For an ω-word w = a1a2... let w(i,j) be the finite segment ai+1...aj-1aj of w.
For every , we define a regular language Lq,q' that is accepted by the finite automaton . 
Lemma: We claim that the Büchi automaton A recognizes the language 
Proof: Let's suppose word  and q0,q1,q2,... is an accepting run of A on w. Therefore,  and, for all  Therefore, 
Hence, .

Equivalence to Monadic second-order logic 

Büchi showed in 1962 that ω-regular languages are precisely the ones definable in a particular monadic second-order logic called S1S.

Bibliography 

 Wolfgang Thomas, "Automata on infinite objects." In Jan van Leeuwen, editor, Handbook of Theoretical Computer Science, volume B: Formal Models and Semantics, pages 133-192. Elsevier Science Publishers, Amsterdam, 1990.

Formal languages